Kord Cernich (born October 20, 1966) is an American retired ice hockey Defenseman and coach who was a two-time All-American for Lake Superior State and helped the Lakers win their first National Championship in 1988.

Career
Cernich played junior hockey for the Dubuque Fighting Saints after graduating from Service High School. He helped the team win the 1985 Clark Cup and followed that up with a spectacular final season in 1986 where he was named as the league's best defenseman. After accepting a scholarship to Lake Superior State University, he quickly became a major contributor for the Lakers, collecting 22 points as a freshman. During his second year, Cernich led the Lakers' defense in scoring and helped the team win their first NCAA Championship. Cernich scored twice in the title match, pushing the Lakers past St. Lawrence 4–3 in overtime.

Lake Superior continued to be a top program while Cernich was there, making two additional NCAA tournament appearances. He was named an All-American both as a junior and senior, leading the Lakers' defense in scoring in 1989 and serving as alternate captain in 1990. After graduating with a bachelor's in marketing, Cernich embarked on a long career in professional hockey. He spent the following season at the top level of the minor leagues. It was the closest he would come to the NHL as he found himself sinking down the minor league ladder over the next few years. He briefly experimented with playing in Europe in 1993 but returned before the season had ended and finished out the year in the ECHL.

In 1994 he returned to Alaska and began playing for the Anchorage Aces. He remained with the team for the next seven years, becoming a fixture on the blueline and playing over 300 games for the Aces. He retired following the 2001 season.

Cernich remained in Anchorage following the end of his playing days and worked as a general foreman for Arctic Electric for a dozen years. He left in 2013 to devote his full attention to being the owner/COO of Arctic Branding And Apparel, a clothing and equipment manufacturer that he co-founded with his wife Angela. He briefly returned to hockey in 2018, working as an assistant coach for the Alaska All Stars U14 team.

Statistics

Regular season and playoffs

Awards and honors

References

External links

1966 births
Living people
Ice hockey people from Alaska
Ice hockey players from Alaska
People from Ketchikan, Alaska
American men's ice hockey defensemen
Dubuque Fighting Saints players
Lake Superior State Lakers men's ice hockey players
AHCA Division I men's ice hockey All-Americans
Binghamton Rangers players
San Diego Gulls (IHL) players
Flint Bulldogs players
Rochester Americans players
Capital District Islanders players
Nottingham Panthers players
Fort Wayne Komets players
Dayton Bombers players
Anchorage Aces players
NCAA men's ice hockey national champions